Silicon Systems Inc. (SSi) (not to be confused with SiliconSystems, Inc.) was an American semiconductor company based in Tustin, California. The company manufactured mixed-signal integrated circuits and semiconductors for telecommunications and data storage.

Company history 

Silicon Systems was founded and incorporated in California on May 17, 1972 by Gene B. Potter, Ronald H. Reeder, and William E. Drobish.  SSi grew to 146 employees and $10.5 million in revenue in 1980.  Its initial public offering was on January 29, 1981.  The company became a supplier of integrated circuits (ICs) for computer disk drives, touch-tone receivers, vehicle loop detectors, and other applications from garage door openers to descrambling satellite broadcast signals.

The company was acquired by TDK Corporation in on May 15, 1989 for $200M.

The company grew to an annual revenue of $400 million as of 1996. It owned wafer fabrication plants in Tustin and Santa Cruz, California, an assembly and test facility in Singapore, and design facilities in San Jose and Grass Valley, California. In 1996, Texas Instruments (TI) acquired the storage products portion of SSi in a deal worth $575 million. TDK retained the communications products business as TDK Semiconductor Corporation (TSC).

In 2005, TSC was purchased by Golden Gate Capital Partners and renamed Teridian Semiconductor.

In 2010, Teridian was purchased by Maxim Integrated Products for $315M in cash.

The Teridian energy measurement products group was then sold to Silergy Corporation on March 18, 2016.

The founders of Silicon Systems came from Scientific Data Systems.

MicroSim Corporation spun off from Silicon Systems in 1984.  In 1998 MicroSim was acquired by OrCAD Systems Corporation.

Silicon Systems Inc. had no relation to another and more recent company named SiliconSystems, Inc. which was founded in 2003, made solid-state drives (SSDs), and was eventually acquired by Western Digital.

Early designs

Designs for integrated circuit houses 
Source:

256-bit and 1024-bit ECL RAM for Signetics
bipolar test chip for Scientific Micro systems
Interface Vector Byte (SMS360) for Scientific Micro systems SMS300 microcontroller series which later became the Signetics 8X300
second source Transistor–transistor logic designs for Advanced Micro Devices
8-bit addressable latch (Silicon Systems first chip completed)
8-bit parallel output shift register
synchronous 4-bit up/down counter
8288 bus controller for Intel

Designs for end users, with SSi supplying the completed circuits 
digital loop detector for Indicator Controls Corporation
the first fully integrated traffic detector
the first chip checked with SSi's proprietary rules checking software
5 chips for Hughes Aircraft Company, Culver City
digital video processor for Hughes Aircraft Company, Canoga Park
S14001A speech synthesis chip for the Speech+ Calculator of Telesensory Systems
video editing time code generator for EECO, Inc. (Electronic Engineering Company of California)
output interface chip for Telesensory Systems Opticon reader for the blind
garage door opener digital transmitter and receiver chips for Linear Corporation
VLA1 and VLA2 correlator chips for Very Large Array of the National Radio Observatory
barricade flasher controller chip for Royal Industries, Inc.
DC011 and DC012 integrated electronics for Digital Equipment Corporation VT100 computer terminal
digital loop detector (second generation) for Detector Systems, Inc.
SC-01 speech synthesis chip implementing vocal tract model for Votrax Division of Federal Screw Works

Designs proprietary to SSi 
SSi 101 servo preamplifier for hard disk drives
SSi 104/105 4 channel read/write head interface for hard disk drives
SSi 201 Dual-tone multi-frequency signaling DTMF receiver for telephony
the first fully integrated DTMF receiver implemented with switched capacitor filters

Early employees 
Early employees of Silicon Systems included:

Locations 
February 1973 to December 1976: 2913 Daimler St., Santa Ana, CA
December 1976 to April 1979: 16692 Hale Ave., Irvine, CA
October 1977 to April 1979: Gary Ave., Irvine, CA - Design Engineering and Personnel
May 1978 to April 1979: 16832 Red Hill Ave., Irvine, CA - Advanced Development
April 1979 onward: 14351 Myford Rd., Tustin, CA

References

External links
COMPANY NEWS;$575 MILLION DEAL FOR TDK SEMICONDUCTOR UNIT (New York Times)

Semiconductor companies of the United States
Defunct companies based in Greater Los Angeles
Companies based in Orange County, California
Electronics companies established in 1972
1972 establishments in California
1989 disestablishments in California
Electronics companies disestablished in 1989
1989 mergers and acquisitions